Andrea Filipi (born 29 April 2003) is an Albanian professional footballer who plays as a forward for Serie D side Arconatese on loan from Alessandria.

Club career
On 19 February 2022 he made his professional debut for Alessandria in a 3–0 away loss against Ascoli.

International career
Filipi was called up the Albania under-17 football team in 2019.

Club statistics

Club

Notes

References

2003 births
Living people
Italian people of Albanian descent
Italian footballers
Albanian footballers
Albania youth international footballers
Association football forwards
Serie B players
U.S. Alessandria Calcio 1912 players